The Premier League of America (PLA) was an American soccer league consisting of teams in cities in the Great Lakes region of the United States. The league was a part of the United States Adult Soccer Association. It began its first season of play in 2015 as the Great Lakes Premier League, and at the end of the 2017 season its member clubs moved to form the Midwest Conference of the United Premier Soccer League.

History

Grand Rapids FC and AFC Ann Arbor both applied to become members of the National Premier Soccer League for the start of the 2015 season and they were both denied admission to the league. Instead of waiting a year or finding another league, the teams decided to start a league of their own. AFC Ann Arbor owner Jamey Amrine and Grand Rapids FC president Matt Roberts began discussions with other teams to gauge interest in forming a new league. Their work led to the formation of the Great Lakes Premier League. The new league held its inaugural league meeting on January 17, 2015 in Grand Rapids, MI.

The two clubs were joined as charter members by Oakland United - later Oakland County FC - based in Rochester, Michigan, and two decades-old Croatian American clubs, Croatian Eagles SC of Milwaukee and RWB Adria of Chicago.

Before the inaugural season began, Milwaukee Bavarians was announced as the first expansion franchise, to begin play in 2016. A second expansion team, Toledo United FC, joined in July 2015.

In September 2015, AFC Ann Arbor and Grand Rapids FC left the GLPL for the NPSL. The following November, the Madison 56ers left the NPSL after eleven seasons to join the Great Lakes Premier League.

The league announced on December 8, 2015 that they would be rebranding as Premier League of America, to more accurately reflect the potential growth of the league away from the Great Lakes area.

Two days later, Carpathia FC of Sterling Heights, Michigan in the Detroit suburbs was added as team number eight. The same month, Aris SC of La Crosse, Wisconsin and Aurora Borealis SC from Aurora, Illinois were added. Aris has since been removed from PLA announcements.

A tenth team was added on January 11, 2016, as Minnesota United FC Reserves moved over from the NPSL. An eleventh team for 2016 was added on January 13, 2016, as Stegman's Soccer Club joined as Minneapolis City SC. After their single season in the PLA, Minneapolis City announced their move to the NPSL.

On August 1, 2016 it was announced that Muskegon Risers SC would join the Premier League of America for the 2017 season after a unanimous 12-0 vote by current team owners.

On September 6, 2017, the United Premier Soccer League announced that eleven of the twelve PLA clubs (all save Grand Rapids Ole SC) had joined its league and would comprise the UPSL's new Midwest Conference.

Competition format
In 2015 the league had a schedule that featured round robin play, where each team played every other team home and away. The league did not host a post-season tournament in 2015 and determined its champion based on the final season standings.

As part of the re-branding announcement for 2016, it was announced there would be a two-division geographical split, with an end-of-season championship playoff. The league will host a championship tournament at a neutral site with the top two teams from each division qualifying.

Teams

1 as Oakland United

Expansion

Champions

2015 standings

2016 standings and playoffs

East Division

West Division

Playoffs

The semifinals were played on July 30. The final and third place matches were played on July 31.
Bold = winner* = after extra time, = penalty shootout score

2017 standings and playoffs

East Division

West Division

Playoffs

Played at Heartland Value Fund Stadium in Glendale, Wisconsin. 
{{4TeamBracket

| RD1         = Semifinal  July 29
| RD2         = Final  July 30

| RD1-seed1   = W1
| RD1-team1   = 
| RD1-score1  = 1
| RD1-seed2   = E2
| RD1-team2   = Carpathia FC| RD1-score2  = 2| RD1-seed3   = E1
| RD1-team3   = RWB Adria
| RD1-score3  = 2
| RD1-seed4   = W2
| RD1-team4   = Milwaukee Bavarians
| RD1-score4  = 4*

| RD2-seed1   = E2
| RD2-team1   = Carpathia FC
| RD2-score1  = 3
| RD2-seed2   = W2
| RD2-team2   = Milwaukee Bavarians| RD2-score2  = 5}}Bold''' = winner* = after extra time, = penalty shootout score

References

External links 
Premier League of America

 
Defunct soccer leagues in the United States
Summer association football leagues